Fitzpatrick may refer to:

Fitzpatrick (surname)

Cases & trials 
Browne–Fitzpatrick privilege case, 1955, an Australian legal case 
Fitzpatrick v Kelly, an 1873 English Queen's Bench decision
Fitzpatrick v. Bitzer, a 1976 United States Supreme Court decision
Fitzpatrick v British Railways Board, a 1992 UK labour law case
Fitzpatrick v Sterling Housing Association Ltd, a 1999 UK case in the House of Lords

Entertainment

Works 
Fitzpatrick's War, a 2004 novel by Theodore Judson
The Fitzpatricks, a 1977 American TV series

Fictional characters 
Carol Fitzpatrick, a character on the American TV series The West Wing
Liam Fitzpatrick (Veronica Mars), a character in the American TV series Veronica Mars
Loren Fitzpatrick, a character in the 2010 season to the New Zealand soap opera Shortland Street
Maddie Fitzpatrick, a character in the American TV sitcom The Suite Life of Zack & Cody
Patrick Fitzpatrick III, a character in the novel series The Saga of Seven Suns by Kevin J. Anderson
Fitzpatrick "Trick" McCorrigan, a character in the Canadian TV series Lost Girl
Richard Fitzpatrick, a character in the Canadian TV series Call Me Fitz

Places 
Fitzpatrick, Alabama, an unincorporated community in Bullock County
Fitzpatrick, Georgia, an unincorporated community in Twiggs County
Fitzpatrick, Quebec, a village served by the Fitzpatrick station in Quebec, Canada
Fitzpatrick, West Virginia, an unincorporated community in Raleigh County
Fitzpatrick Center, a research facility at Duke University, Durham, North Carolina, US
Fitzpatrick Building, an 1890 commercial building in Saint Paul, Minnesota, US
Fitzpatrick Hotel, an 1898 historic hotel in Washington, Georgia, US
Fitzpatrick House (disambiguation), several historic places in the United States
Fitzpatrick Rock, part of the Windmill Islands, Antarctica
Fitzpatrick Stadium, an outdoor stadium in Portland, Maine, US
Fitzpatrick Wilderness, a protected area in Shoshone National Forest, Wyoming, US
Mount Fitzpatrick, the highest peak in the Salt River Range, Wyoming, US

Other 
Fitzpatrick's Herbal Health, a temperance bar in Lancashire, England
Fitzpatrick Lecture, an annual lecture given at the British Royal College of Physicians
Fitzpatrick scale, a numerical classification schema for human skin color

See also 
James A. FitzPatrick Nuclear Power Plant, a power plant near Oswego, New York, US
Percy FitzPatrick Institute of African Ornithology, a research center in Cape Town, South Africa
Phillips Ormonde Fitzpatrick, an Australian intellectual property firm